White Deer Plain is a 2017 Chinese television series. It is based on the Chinese literature classic of the same name by Chen Zhongshi. Its plot revolves around the hardships and spiritual pursuits of several generations living on the White Deer Plain in Shaanxi.

The series reportedly took 17 years of preparation and had a production budget of 230 million yuan (US$33.39 million). It mirrors the changes which have taken place in the Chinese countryside over the first half of the 20th century, and the crew spent time in the countryside to experience rural life for a month before filming commenced. The series is directed by Liu Huining and Liu Jin, and stars Zhang Jiayi as the main character. The 85 episode drama premiered on Anhui TV and Jiangsu TV on 16 April 2017. However, the show was taken off air after one episode. It resumed airing on 10 May 2017.

The series received positive response on Douban. People's Daily praise the series for retaining the essence and spirit of the original work while making the story more dramatic and fascinating, and The Beijing News say that the series is one of the best produced on television. However, it has low viewership ratings, which has been attributed to the heavier subject matter of the drama. White Deer Plain received the Outstanding TV Series Golden Angel Award at the 2017 Chinese American Film Festival (CAFF) at the Paramount Theatre in Los Angeles.

Plot
This is the story of the White Deer Plain, home to the struggles of the Bai and Lu families. Bai Jiaxuan is honest and righteous while Lu Zisen is intelligent and ambitious. Their rivalry lasted for three generations.

Cast
Zhang Jiayi as Bai Jiaxuan
He Bing as Lu Zisen
Qin Hailu as Xiancao
Liu Peiqi as Mister Zhu
Liu Hongtao as Lu San
Ge Zhiyun as Lu Taiheng
Lei Jiayin as Lu Yaopeng
Zhai Tianlin as Bai Xiaowen
Li Qin as Tian Xiao'e
Ji Ta as Hei Wa
Deng Lun as Lu Yaohai
Wang Xiao as Bai Xiaowu
Sun Yi as Bai Ling

Ratings 

 Highest ratings are marked in red, lowest ratings are marked in blue.

Awards and nominations

See also
White Deer Plain (film)

References

External links

2017 Chinese television series debuts
2017 Chinese television series endings
Chinese period television series
Chinese drama television series
Television shows based on Chinese novels
Mandarin-language television shows
Television series by New Classics Media